Elísio de Figueiredo served as the first ambassador of Angola to the United Nations from 1976 to 1988 as well as the Minister of Industry.

On 16 March 1979, de Figueiredo, in his letter to the United Nations, requested an urgent meeting of the United Nations Security Council on the question of South Africa’s continuous acts of aggression in Angola.

References

External links
UN.int Angolan ambassadors to the United Nations

Permanent Representatives of Angola to the United Nations
Living people
Year of birth missing (living people)
Place of birth missing (living people)